Vovkove is a village in Uzhhorod Raion of Zakarpattia Oblast in Ukraine.

Demographics
Native language as of the Ukrainian Census of 2001:
 Ukrainian 99.41%
 Others 0.39%

References

Villages in Uzhhorod Raion